Emotional Design is both the title of a book by Donald Norman and of the concept it represents.

Content
The main topic covered is how emotions have a crucial role in the human ability to understand the world, and how they learn new things. In fact, studies show that emotion influences people's information processing and decision-making  For example: aesthetically pleasing objects appear to the user to be more effective, by virtue of their sensual appeal. This is due to the affinity the user feels for an object that appeals to them, due to the formation of an emotional connection with the object. Consequently, It is believed that companies and designers should not rely on pricey marketing; they should link their services to customers’ emotions and daily lives to get them “hooked” on a product.

Norman's approach is based on classical ABC model of attitudes. However, he changed the concept to be suitable for application in design. The three dimensions have new names (visceral, behavioral and reflective level) and partially new content .

The first is the “visceral” level which is about immediate initial reactions people unconsciously do and are greatly determined by sensory factors (look, feel, smell, and sound). Norman argued that attractive products work better because they can engage multiple senses to evoke emotional responses and bonds through use of visual factors of color, texture, and shape. He contends that beautifully designed products make people feel good. This is where appearance matters, and first impressions are formed, and the texture and surface of an object become important in evoking a specific emotional reaction. Thus, viscerally well-designed products tend to evoke positive emotions and experiences in the consumers.

The second is “behavioral” level which is all about use; what does a product do, what function does it perform? Good behavioral design should be human centered, focusing upon understanding and satisfying the needs of people who use the product. This level of design starts with understanding the user’s demands, ideally derived from conducting studies of relevant behavior in homes, schools, places of work, or wherever the product will be used.  

The third is “reflective” level at which the product has meaning for consumers; the emotional connections which are formed over time using the product and are influenced by cultural, social, and personal factors. Via good reflective design, people will feel a sense of personal bond and identity with an object, and it will become a part of their daily lives. It is how we remember the experience itself and how it made us feel.

In summary, the visceral level concerns itself with the aesthetic or attractiveness of an object. The behavioral level considers the function and usability of the product. The reflective level takes into account prestige and value; this is often influenced by the branding of a product.

In the book, Norman shows that design of most objects are perceived on all three levels (dimensions). Therefore, a good design should address all three levels. Norman also mentions in his book that "technology should bring more to our lives than the improved performance of tasks: it should be richness and enjoyment." (pg 101) He stresses the importance of creating fun and pleasurable products instead of dull and dreary ones. By mixing all three design levels and the four pleasures by Patrick W. Jordan, the product should evoke an emotion when the user is interacting with the product. The interaction of these three levels of design leads to the culmination of the “emotional design,” a new, holistic approach to designing successful products and creates enduring and delightful product experience.

Emotional design is an important element when generating ideas for human-centered opportunities. People can more easily relate to a product, a service, a system, or an experience when they are able to connect with it at a personal level. Rather than thinking that there is one solution for all, both Norman's three design levels and Jordan's four pleasures of design can help us design for each individual's needs. Both concepts can be used as tools to better connect with the end user that it is being design for. This viewpoint is gaining a lot of acceptance in the business world; for example, Postrel argues that the “look and feel” of people, places, and things are more important than we think. In other words, people today are more concerned with the look and feel of products than with their functionality.

Cover
The front cover of Emotional Design showcases Philippe Starck's Juicy Salif, an icon of industrial design that Norman heralds as an "item of seduction" and the manifestation of his thesis.

Concept 
Emotions are a fundamental aspect of human experience, and our emotional responses to people, places, and objects are shaped by a complex interplay of factors. As Peter Boatwright and Jonathan Cagan point out, “emotion is human, and its reach is vast". In the current marketplace, successful companies are not just creating good products, but also producing captivating ones that not only attract consumer attention, but also influence their demands and increase their engagement based on both the product's performance and how it makes them feel.

Emotional design is also influenced by the four pleasures, identified in Designing Pleasurable Products by Patrick W. Jordan. In this book Patrick W. Jordan builds on the work of Lionel Tiger to identify the four kinds of pleasures. Jordan describes these as “modes of motivation that enhance a product or a service. Life is unenjoyable without appreciating what we do, and it is human intuition to seek pleasure.” The idea of incorporating pleasure into products is to provide the buyer with an added experience. Patrick W. Jordan points out in his book that a product should be more than something functional and/or aesthetically pleasing and it should evoke an emotion through the use of pleasures. Although it is hard to achieve all four pleasures into one product, by simply focusing on one, it might be what can bring a product from being chosen over another. The four pleasures that could be implemented into products or a service are:

Physio-pleasure deals with the body and pleasure derived from the sensory organs. This includes taste, touch, and smell, as well as sexual and sensual pleasure. In the context of products, these pleasures can be associated with tactile properties (the way interaction with the product feels) or olfactory properties (the leather smell in a new car, for example).

Socio-pleasure is the enjoyment derived from the company of others. Products can facilitate social interaction in a number of ways, either through providing a service that brings people together (a coffee-maker enabling a host to provide their guests with fresh coffee) or by being a talking point in and of itself.

Psycho-pleasure is defined as pleasure which is gained from the accomplishment of a task. In a product context, psycho-pleasure relates to the extent in which a product can help in task completion and make the accomplishment a satisfying experience. This pleasure may also take into account the efficiency with which a task can be completed (a word processor with built-in formatting decreasing the amount of time spent on creating a document, for example).

Ideo-pleasure refers to pleasure derived from theoretical entities such as books, music, and art. It may relate to the aesthetics of a product and the values it embodies. A product made of bio-degradable material, for example, can be seen as holding value in the environment which, in turn, may appeal to someone who wishes to be environmentally responsible.

The Use of Emotional Design

In Film 
People mostly know film as an entertainment but film can do more than that. Gianluca Sergi and Alan Lovell cite a study in their essays on cinema entertainment that the film users (the viewers) see films as an escape from reality and a source of amusement, relaxation and knowledge, meaning films also function as an educational tool and a method of stress relief. Specifically, comparing to emotional design, film fulfills the requirements it needs. Firstly, movies have an attractive appearance. Whether movies start with a black and white concept like in Oz the Great and Powerful or an oddly colorful, but serious theme as in Suicide Squad, they usually capture the audiences’ attention, who then want to continue watching the whole show. The “wow” reaction that viewers have is the visceral reaction, according to how Don Norman explains the three levels of design in his book Emotional Design: Why We Love (or Hate) Everyday Things, “[w]hen we perceive something as “pretty,” that judgment comes directly from the visceral level.”(65-66) Secondly, the behavioral level: in a literal sense, the only function of movies is to be watched. With the advancement of technology, movies now have high resolution, as well as various lighting dynamics and camera angles. Lastly, applying Don Norman’s statement on how products can add positively to the self-image of the users and how good the users feel after owning the products, film does influence its viewers greatly and affect the way they act. Trice and Greer indicate that “we identify with characters on the screen who are like us in terms of age, sex and other characteristics; we also identify with people we would like to be like.[...] We tend to imitate “good” characters” (135). That being said, movies do not label any of their characters good or bad in a straightforward manner; the viewers only learn about the characters through the narrative, which production design is a part of.

See also
Kansei engineering – a design approach incorporating emotional elements
Sustainable design

References

Psychology books
Industrial design
2003 non-fiction books